The 2014–15 Nemzeti Bajnokság I, or NB I, was the 113th season of top-tier football in Hungary.

2014–15 Nemzeti Bajnokság I may also refer to:
2014–15 Nemzeti Bajnokság I (men's handball)
2014–15 Nemzeti Bajnokság I (men's volleyball)
2014–15 Nemzeti Bajnokság I (women's handball)
2014–15 Nemzeti Bajnokság I (women's volleyball)

See also
2014–15 Nemzeti Bajnokság I/A (men's basketball)
2014–15 Nemzeti Bajnokság I/A (women's basketball)